Poropuntius alloiopleurus is a species of cyprinid fish that is found in the eastern Asian countries of China, Laos and Vietnam.

References

Cyprinid fish of Asia
Freshwater fish of China
Fish described in 1893